Byron Boston is an American football official in the National Football League (NFL) since the 1995 NFL season.  He is a line judge and wears the uniform number 18.  During his NFL officiating career, Boston was assigned Super Bowl XXXIV in 2000 and has worked two wild card playoff games (1999 and 2005), three divisional playoff games (1996, 2002, and 2003), and three conference championship games (1997, 1998, and 2005).

Boston graduated from Austin College in Sherman, Texas with a bachelor's degree in Economics.

He began his officiating career in 1977 in Dallas, Texas where he worked Texas high school football from 1977 to 1984, which included two State Championship games.  After working high school games, Boston moved up to Junior College football in 1985 and later joined the Southland Conference in 1987. In 1990, Boston began working games in the Southwest Conference.  Over his college football officiating career,  Boston was selected for Division 1AA playoff games and ended his final game at the collegiate level with the 1994 Holiday Bowl.

In 1995, Boston was selected to the NFL officiating staff and has nine post-season assignments since joining the league.

Boston and his wife Carolyn reside in Humble, Texas and have three children, Alicia, Byron Jr., and David.  David was an American football wide receiver in the NFL.  Byron Boston works as a tax consultant outside of his NFL officiating duties.

For the 2017 NFL season, Boston will serve as the line judge on the officiating crew headed by referee Walt Anderson.

On February 15, 2007, the Southland Conference named Byron Boston as coordinator of football officials.

Boston was chosen as the line judge for Super Bowl XLVII.

References

External links
Byron Boston - NFL Football Officials Camps, LLC.  (Accessed August 21, 2006).

Living people
African-American sports officials
National Football League officials
Austin College alumni
Sportspeople from Harris County, Texas
Year of birth missing (living people)
21st-century African-American people